The Women's 10 kilometre freestyle event of the FIS Nordic World Ski Championships 2015 was held on 24 February 2015. A 5 km qualification race was held on 18 February 2015.

Results

Race
The race was started at 13:30.

Qualification
The race was held at 13:30.

References

Women's 10 kilometre freestyle
2015 in Swedish women's sport